Life imprisonment in the Republic of Ireland may last for the natural life of the convict. It is not necessarily "life imprisonment" in practice, as not all of the life sentence is generally served in prison custody. The granting of temporary or early release of life sentenced prisoners is a feature of the Irish prison system handled by the Minister for Justice.

In deciding on the release from prison of a prisoner sentenced to life imprisonment, the Minister will always consider the advice and recommendations of the Parole Board of Ireland: the Board, as of 2021, will normally review prisoners sentenced to life imprisonment after 12 years have been served (previously seven). However, the sentencing judge can order that the prisoner is to serve a longer period (up to a maximum of 30 years), or order that the prisoner is never to be considered for parole.

Prisoners serving very long sentences, including life sentences, are normally reviewed on a number of occasions over a number of years before any substantial concessions are recommended by the Board.

The final decision as to whether a life sentenced prisoner is released rests solely with the Minister, and as such, the length of time spent in custody by offenders serving life sentences can vary substantially.

Mandatory sentence
Life imprisonment is the mandatory sentence in Ireland for murder or treason.

Possible sentence
Life imprisonment is a possible sentence in Ireland for assault causing serious harm, possessing firearm or ammunition with intent to endanger life or cause serious injury, aggravated robbery, possession of controlled drugs with intent to supply, and rape resulting in death or serious injury.

References

Ireland
Irish criminal law